Weequahic (pronounced , or WEEK-wake "when spoken rapidly") is a neighborhood in the city of Newark in Essex County, New Jersey, United States.  Part of the South Ward, it is separated from Clinton Hill by Hawthorne Avenue on the north, and bordered by the township of Irvington on the west, Newark Liberty International Airport and Dayton on the east, and Hillside Township and the city of Elizabeth on the south. There are many well maintained homes and streets. Part of the Weequahic neighborhood has been designated a historic district; major streets are Lyons Avenue, Bergen Street, and Chancellor Avenue.

History
The name "Weequahic" is Lenni-Lenape for "head of the cove".  The area was farmland until the late nineteenth century when it was developed into a middle-class, non-industrial neighborhood of detached single-family homes oriented around Weequahic Park. Later many multi-unit homes were built to the west, and later still a few residential modernist highrises were built.

Weequahic was largely a middle class Jewish neighborhood until the late 1960s, home to many synagogues, yeshivas, and Jewish restaurants. Newark Beth Israel Medical Center (in Weequahic), the largest hospital in Newark, was built under auspices of the Jewish community. The only remaining connection to the Jewish community is Bragman's Delicatessen and Restaurant at 393 Hawthorne Avenue.

Author Philip Roth grew up on Summit Avenue, graduated from Weequahic High School in 1950, and many of his novels (such as American Pastoral, Nemesis) are set there. Heart of Stone, a documentary by Beth Toni Kruvant produced by Zach Braff, focuses on Weequahic High School's decline from the 1950s when it graduated more PhDs than any other high school in the country, to one of Newark, NJ's most poorly performing schools.  Principal Ron Stone inspires the students, to graduate and go to college.  He partners with the Jewish and African-American alumni association to help the current students.

The post-World War II growth of suburbs and Second Great Migration of African Americans altered the demographic make-up of Newark in general and the Weequahic section in particular.   The neighborhood might have stayed middle class if not for the devastating effects of real estate blockbusting, white flight, and the construction of Interstate 78.  I-78 tore Weequahic's fragile urban fabric and separated the neighborhood from the rest of Newark. There are still many well maintained homes and streets in the neighborhood. The 1967 civil unrest was also devastating to the district, though the focal point was in the Central Ward.

Weequahic Park
The jewel of the neighborhood is the  Olmsted Brothers-designed Weequahic Park. This park has a  rubberized jogging path around its  lake and Weequahic Golf Course, the oldest public golf course in the United States. It is listed on the state and federal registers of historic places.

Elizabeth Avenue Corridor
Several highrise apartment buildings were built in the 1960s along the Elizabeth Avenue Corridor opposite the park.

440 Elizabeth Avenue, formerly Carmel Towers, is a residential tower and parking structure which opened in 1970. Originally built as market rate rentals, it became affordable housing for individuals and families with low income. Rent was based on 30% of adjusted gross income and was subsidized by United States Department of Housing and Urban Development under a program known as Section 8. Conditions in the building deteriorated, with the structure becoming a center of drug-dealing and violence. In 2011, the building was vacated due to failed inspections. The buildings were sold in 2015, and as of 2019 there were plans for redevelopment and gut rehabilitation of its 216 apartments and renaming as the Essex Lake House. 

Zion Towers, at 515 Elizabeth Avenue, is a residential tower built atop a parking structure that opened in 1972 that is one of the tallest buildings in Newark. It also provides affordable housing. The building was sold for $28 million in 2018 with plans to upgrade it.

Other buildings  include the 22-story Elizabeth Towers at 455 and the 24-story Heritage Estates at 555.

Education
Newark Public Schools operates public schools. Weequahic High School serves the neighborhood.

The Weequahic Branch Library of the Newark Public Library (NPL) serves the neighborhood. The branch, which opened in May 1929, was the sixth NPL branch to open between 1923 and 1946. In 1992 the library system renovated the branch for $1 million; the renovation added air conditioning, online public access computers, an elevator, new lighting, off-street parking, and a children's storytelling pit.

References

Further reading

External links
 Newark history

Jews and Judaism in Newark, New Jersey
Neighborhoods in Newark, New Jersey
Populated places in Essex County, New Jersey